William Shuster or Schuster may refer to: 

Bill Schuster (1912–1987), American baseball player
William Morgan Shuster (1877–1960), American lawyer and civil servant
William Howard Shuster (1893–1969), American artist
Bill Shuster (born 1961), American politician and lobbyist
William Schuster (born 1987), Brazilian footballer